Nepisiguit Bay (from the Mi’kmaq word , which means "rough water") is located in northern New Brunswick, Canada on the southern part of the Chaleur Bay (French: Baie des Chaleurs), which extends from the Atlantic Ocean and Nepisiguit Bay is a southern arm of it, stretching between Petit-Rocher and Stonehaven.

The current site of the city of Bathurst was a summer home of the Mi’kmaq First Nation that they called Nepisiguit. The first Permanent  Europeans settlers from France arrived in 1619. Commodore George Walker, a successful British privateer, setup a fishing and trading operation on the Nepisiguit Bay in 1768 at the present day location of Youghall Park. These installations were later destroyed in 1778 by American Pirates. Fishing operations didn't resume until 1784 when Colonel Arthur Goold  received most of the Eastern shore of Nepisiguit Bay forcing Acadian Settlers to  settle on the Western shore of the Bay. Hugh Munro arrived in Nepisiguit area in 1794 and began a Merchant and Fish operations later expanding into lumbering. By 1818, he claimed his operation was the  longest serving one  in the Nepisiguit Bay. By that time, he was building ships, employing many people.

Nepisiguit Bay is a popular spot in summer with cottages lining both sides of the bay. Both  Youghall Beach in Bathurst  and Beresford beach are both popular destinations for locals over the summer months.

Coastal communities
Nepisiguit Bay is home to a number of  coastal communities.
 City of Bathurst
 Town of Belle-Baie
 LSD of New Bandon-Salmon Beach
 Community Janeville

Rivers

The following  rivers flow into the bay:
 Peters River
 Millstream River
 Tetagouche River
 Middle River
 Nepisiguit River
 Little River

References 

Geography of New Brunswick
Bays of New Brunswick